Dubai Museum is the main museum in Dubai, United Arab Emirates. It is located in the Al Fahidi Fort, built in 1787 and is the oldest existing building in Dubai.

The museum was opened by the Ruler of Dubai in 1971, with the aim of presenting the traditional way of life in the Emirate of Dubai. When entering, one can see the fort constructed and the various displays that go along with it. From the fort, there is a path to the galleries, which display the general culture of the land, especially in the 1800s. It includes local antiques as well as artifacts from African and Asian countries that traded with Dubai. It also includes several dioramas showing life in the emirate before the advent of oil, in addition to artifacts from recent discoveries as old as 3000 BC.

In 2007, Dubai Museum received 1,800 visitors daily, with a yearly total of 611,840. In March 2008, the museum had 80,000 visitors. The most popular times are from August to April. The museum received over 1 million visitors in 2013. The total area of Dubai museum is 4,000 square meters.

History

Al Fahidi Fort was built in several phases. The oldest tower was built around 1787, and is believed to be the oldest building in Dubai that still exists today. The fort was used to guard the landward approaches to the town from the raids of neither ruler's palace, a garrison, and a prison.

In 1969 Sheikh Hamdan Bin Rashid Al Maktoum issued a letter to Sheikh Badr Mohammad Al Sabah, head of the office of state in Kuwait, asking for a museum expert to be sent to Dubai to help establish the museum.

Fort

Al Fahidi Fort is square-shaped with towers occupying three of its corners. It was built of coral rock and mortar in several phases. Just off the southern wall lie a reconstruction of the old city walls. Next to them stands a tall dhow (traditional boat) in the middle of a large courtyard that covers the underground galleries. Two cannons guard the main gate to the fort on the eastern wall, adorned by flags of Dubai and the United Arab Emirates.

Internal halls line three of the fort walls. One hall is at the main gate and houses the ticket office, while the others contain a collection of old weapons and arms from different historical periods along with a model of the city in 1820 AD. Traditional musical instruments are also displayed next to a video of folkloric music.

The halls surround a central courtyard. Here you will find a bronze cannon with cannonballs, a well, and various types of boats. In the corner stands a traditional summer house called Arish. The Arish is made entirely from weaved palm fronds. It comprises seating and sleeping areas as well as a kitchen, filled with household furnishings and objects used by the locals in past times. The Arish features the distinct wind tower design, used for air conditioning in the pre-electricity days.

Galleries
Entrance to the galleries is located at the tower on the south-western corner of the fort. After descending the spiral stairs visitors enter the first gallery, where old maps of Dubai are displayed. Next is the video room, showing a video, updated in 2007, that depicts Dubai from before the discovery of oil in the 1960s to the current day. Below it there is a map that shows the urban scape of the city growing in sync with the timeline of the video.

Life-size dioramas of the pre-oil era await behind the next door. Once they enter, visitors will set foot on the deck of a dhow unloading at the model creek-side souq. Moving ahead they will see the shops filled with craftsmen, vendors and buyers. A tailor, a carpenter, an iron smith, a textile vendor and others line the street. Realistic sounds and life-size videos of craftsmen at work give the impression of a bustling souq.

The street leads to a model of a mosque, house and family, then turns to the right where it is surrounded by depictions of desert life with a date farm, a camel, wild animals, and a Bedouin tent filled with jewelry, trinkets and objects from the daily life of Bedouins. The walls tell about their knowledge of the stars and how they used it to guide their activities. Next is the largest diorama which is all about the sea, with a huge scene of the building of a dhow, scenes of marine life detailing local species, in addition to a collection of seafaring equipment. The last diorama features an archaeological site in Al Qusais area that goes back to 3000 BC. There are tombs, an excavated skeleton, and an archaeologist. All the way sounds, visual effects and electronic guides accompany the dioramas.

Cabinets filled with archaeological finds from Al Qusais site line the walls next to the excavation scene. Finally, the winding track leads to a gallery displaying finds from other sites and historical eras, like the Umayyad site at Jumeirah. The gift shop is the last stop before a spiral ramp takes you up to the museum's southern exit.

Transport 
Visitors can reach Dubai Museum by public buses through the Ghubaiba or Fahidi bus stations nearby or by metro station of the Ghubaiba or Fahidi which is also located nearby. Rented cars or tours operators also provide transportation services.

Footnotes

References
حصن الفهيدي بدبي "Al Fahidi Fort in Dubai", Alriyadh newspaper, 8 April 2001. 
Al Feheidi Fort  on the Dubai Municipality's "Dubai Historic" website. (requires Internet Explorer to view correctly)
Attractions:Dubai Museum on Dubai Government's website.

External links 
 
 
 Dubai Museum Website
 Gulf News | Dubai Museum

Infrastructure completed in 1787
Museums established in 1971
Museums in Dubai
City museums in the United Arab Emirates
History museums in the United Arab Emirates
National museums of the United Arab Emirates
Forts in the United Arab Emirates
Castles in the United Arab Emirates
History of Dubai
Museums established in 1787